Yuriy Volodymyrovych Benyo (born 25 April 1974) is a Ukrainian former professional footballer who played as a defender and current assistant manager at Shakhtar Donetsk.

Career
He played for Karpaty Lviv, Shakhtar Donetsk, Metalurh Zaporizhzhia and Arsenal Kyiv in the Ukrainian Premier League.

External links
 Information about Yuriy Benyo on Arsenal-Kiev.com.ua
 Official Website Profile
 Profile on soccer.ru
 
 

1974 births
Living people
Sportspeople from Lviv
Ukrainian footballers
Association football defenders
FC Sokil Lviv players
FC Haray Zhovkva players
FC Karpaty Lviv players
FC Karpaty-2 Lviv players
FC Lviv (1992) players
FC Shakhtar Donetsk players
FC Shakhtar-2 Donetsk players
FC Metalurh Zaporizhzhia players
FC Metalurh-2 Zaporizhzhia players
SSSOR Metalurh Zaporizhzhia players
FK Venta players
FC Arsenal Kyiv players
FC Volyn Lutsk players
Ukrainian Premier League players
Ukrainian First League players
Ukrainian Second League players
Ukrainian Amateur Football Championship players
Latvian Higher League players
Ukrainian expatriate footballers
Expatriate footballers in Latvia
Ukrainian expatriate sportspeople in Latvia
Ukrainian football managers
FC Lviv managers
FC Shakhtar Donetsk non-playing staff
Ukrainian First League managers
Ukrainian expatriate sportspeople in Slovenia
21st-century Ukrainian people